The Algonquian Confederacy of the Quinnipiac Tribal Council (ACQTC) is an alliance dedicated to the history and culture of the Quinnipiac, the aboriginal peoples of the North American region now known as Connecticut. ACQTC, Inc. incorporated under the laws of the State of Connecticut as a 501(c)(3) tax exempt non-profit/non-stock corporation in 1989, after a decade of organizing the Quinnipiac people. The Internal Revenue Service, on January 18, 2001, under its Tribal Government Organization Section, has determined that ACQTC is additionally a 509(a)(2) entity.

Iron Thunderhorse is the Grand Sachem (equivalent to CEO) of ACQTC. The graphic at right, used prominently on the ACQTC website is his interpretation of a pictograph found on an artifact found in the region originally inhabited by the Quinnipiac. Thunderhorse claims this is a traditional Thunder Clan design known as a THUNDERER — half thunderbird, half human.

Purpose Statement
According to their website, the stated purposes of the ACQTC are:

 To preserve, protect, enhance, and propagate our Native American, Algonquian-speaking cultural heritage;
 To revive, restore, and revitalize the language and culture in particular of the Quinnipiac people (originally of SW Connecticut) and our kindred;
 To protect and restore Mother Earth, Father Sky and all our relations to their natural balance and to foster respect and harmony in this quest;
 To teach and share the values, history, culture, language, arts & crafts, of the Quinnipiac and kindred Algonquian peoples, whose traditions were considered lost until the ACQTC was formed;
 To research and keep current with indigenous affairs and to promote both unity and harmony in the Native American communities, on and off the reservations;
 To share our personal pride, ancestral knowledge, and wisdom;
 To lecture, perform, and teach or otherwise present our culture, values, and ceremonies as an Algonquian ethos and map for living in balance in our world.

Membership
According to their website, the ACQTC has three forms of membership: full, confederate, and honorary.

Full membership includes those whose lineages trace back to the family names of Manweeyeuh, Mahwee, Cockenoe, Nonsuch, Soebuck, Redhead, Sock, Brown, Adams, Griswold, Parmalee, Curley, Skeesucks, LaFrance, Quinney, Ninham, Dean, Thompson/Tompson, Peters, Montour, Marchand, Klingerschmidt, Moses, Cornelius, Higheum, Waubeno, Douglas, Scott, Anthony, Butler, Burnham, Rouleau, and Hazel. ACQTC reports there are 50 to 100 families in this category.

Confederate membership includes refugee families who trace their ancestry to the refugiums and enclaves cited above at New York, Massachusetts, Pennsylvania, Rhode Island, Indiana, Ohio, Wisconsin, Kansas, Texas, and Quebec (Canada). ACQTC reports there are about 100 families in this category.

Honorary membership are adoptees who "enter into the sacred BOND OF THE COVENANT with the ACQTC Central Council Fire and ACQTC Grand Council Fire Confederacy to honor, protect, and revitalize our language, religion, and traditions, and to honor our traditional obligations as Gechanniwitank (aboriginal land-stewards), under our 'aboriginal title to land' rights, where Quinnipiac ancestors worshipped the creator and creation at certain landmarks within our ancestral sachemdom." ACQTC reports there are 25 to 50 families in this category.

Organizational structure
The ACQTC is an alliance of two separate tribal councils. The Quinnipiac Tribal Council (QTC) is described as the "maweomi of Elders [which] includes sachems, sagamores, dudas (clan mothers), a head-woman, etc., who represent the full membership." The Algonquian Confederacy (AC) operates as the "Grand Council" of confederated allies (i.e. other tribal groups of the Algonquian family). Another analogy was provided by Iron Thunderhorse in his 2002-01-17 column in the Branford Review: "The AC (Algonquian Confederacy) is our Grand Council comparative to the U.S. Senate, while QTC (Quinnipiac Tribal Council or central fire) is comparative to the U.S. House of Representatives."

Annual Powwow
For several years, the ACQTC cosponsored an annual powwow, open to the public, in Branford, Connecticut, and vicinity during the third weekend in July. The last public annual powwow was held at the Ancoda Farm near Scotland, Connecticut, in July 2003. In previous years it had been held in the Branford, Connecticut area. The annual powwow has been closed to the public since then so ACQTC and cosponsoring organizations could "focus [their] efforts on organizing a volunteer workforce, holding fund drives, and obtaining grants to build up the infrastructure at the Ancoda Farm gathering site (new roads, parking areas, and campsites)."

References

Non-profit organizations based in Connecticut
Native American rights organizations
Algonquian ethnonyms
1989 establishments in Connecticut
Unrecognized tribes in the United States